A voluntary association established in 1965 by Geoff Spencer, the Alcuin Society is a non-profit organisation founded for the book arts. It is located in Canada. It should not be confused with the Alcuin Club, an Anglican publishing society. 

Among the other six founding members is Basil Stuart-Stubbs.

The society is named after Alcuin of York.

Awards
Since 1981, the society has awarded an Annual Award for Excellence in Book Design in Canada. It is the ony national book design competition. In 2007, the society started awarding the Robert R. Reid Award and Medal for lifetime achievement or extraordinary contributions to the book arts in Canada.

Robert R. Reid Award and Medal winners 
2020 Odette Drapeau
2019 Tim & Elke Inkster
2018 Robert Bringhurst
2017 Denise Lapointe & David Carruthers
2015 Rod McDonald
2015 Jan & Crispin Elsted, Barbarian Press
2013 William Rueter RCA MGDC
2012 Stan Bevington
2011 Glenn Goluska
2010 Jim Rimmer
2009 Frank Newfeld
2007 Robert R. Reid

Publications
The society's journal is Amphora (ISSN 0003-200X)
From Writer to Reader is an ejournal (ISSN 1911-7302) It is deposited with E-LIS.

References

External links

Amphora
Annual Award for Excellence in Book Design
Basil Stuart-Stubbs at BC BookWorld
E-LIS
From Writer to Reader

Book collecting
Organizations established in 1965
1965 establishments in Canada